Players and pairs who neither have high enough rankings nor receive wild cards may participate in a qualifying tournament held one week before the annual Wimbledon Tennis Championships.

Seeds

  Lucie Hradecká /  Hana Šromová (qualified)
  Ekaterina Bychkova /  Milagros Sequera (first round)
  María José Argeri /  Letícia Sobral (first round)
  Chan Chin-wei /  Hsieh Su-wei (qualifying competition, lucky losers)
  Stéphanie Cohen-Aloro /  María José Martínez Sánchez (qualified)
  Yuliana Fedak /  Tatiana Perebiynis (qualified)
  Lilia Osterloh /  Ahsha Rolle (qualified)
  Melinda Czink /  Vania King (qualifying competition, lucky losers)

Qualifiers

  Lucie Hradecká /  Hana Šromová
  Stéphanie Cohen-Aloro /  María José Martínez Sánchez
  Yuliana Fedak /  Tatiana Perebiynis
  Lilia Osterloh /  Ahsha Rolle

Lucky losers

  Chan Chin-wei /  Hsieh Su-wei
  Melinda Czink /  Vania King
  Mariana Díaz Oliva /  Natalie Grandin

Qualifying draw

First qualifier

Second qualifier

Third qualifier

Fourth qualifier

External links

2006 Wimbledon Championships on WTAtennis.com
2006 Wimbledon Championships – Women's draws and results at the International Tennis Federation

Women's Doubles Qualifying
Wimbledon Championship by year – Women's doubles qualifying
Wimbledon Championships